Pemphigus herpetiformis  is a cutaneous condition, a clinical variant of pemphigus that combines the clinical features of dermatitis herpetiformis with the immunopathologic features of pemphigus.

Pathophysiology

Pemphigus Herpetiformis is an IGg mediated autoantibodies that affect the epidermal layer of the skin.

Diagnosis

See also 
 Adult linear IgA disease
 List of cutaneous conditions

References 

Chronic blistering cutaneous conditions